Thio may refer to:

Science
 Thio-, a chemical prefix indicating the presence of a sulfur atom
 Thio, an abbreviation of thioglycolate broth

Places
 Thio, Benin, an arrondissement in Benin
 Thio, New Caledonia, a commune on the Pacific island
 Thio River, a river in New Caledonia

People
 Johnny Thio (1944–2008), Belgian footballer
 Thio Li-ann (born 1968), Singaporean law professor
 Teoh, a Chinese surname sometimes rendered as "Thio"

Other
 Thio Sport, a New Caledonian football team